Breona is a rural locality in the local government area (LGA) of Central Highlands in the Central LGA region of Tasmania. The 2016 census recorded a population of 14 for the state suburb of Breona.

History 
Breona was gazetted as a locality in 1969. It was previously known as Tiagarra. Breona is believed to be an Aboriginal word for “fish”. 

In the past it has been a trout hatchery and a tourist resort.

Geography
The waters of the Great Lake form most of the southern and eastern boundaries.

Road infrastructure 
Route A5 (Highland Lakes Road) runs through from north to south.

References

Towns in Tasmania
Localities of Central Highlands Council